Santan ( child) is a 1999 Indian Bengali film directed by Anjan Choudhury.

Plot
The film explores the relationship between three sons and their parents. After marriage, the three sons and their wives make the parents and the sister mere servants. Once, one of the children brought one of his colleagues to live in the room in which their parents stayed and asked the parents to sleep on the staircase in the house. The person realised this and was proud to think of their parents as his parents. He made a plan and told the three sons that his father possesses 1.5 lakh rupees and will give it to the child who takes the maximum care of their parents. By this trap, the children start to really love their parents. Ultimately, this person becomes successful in his attempt to reunite the parents with their three sons and their wives.

Cast

 Ranjit Mallick
 Tapas Pal
 Chumki Chowdhury
 Gita Dey
 Biplab Chattopadhyay
 Rita Koiral
 Subrata Chattopadhyay
 Kushal Chakraborty
 Moumita Gupta
 Piya Sengupta
 Rina Chowdhury
 Shankar Ghosh
  Satya Bandopadhyay

References

External links
 

1999 films
Bengali-language Indian films
1990s Bengali-language films